Dani Campbell is an American  reality show personality who became notable in the lesbian community as a symbol of self-assurance, causing Curve to call her "the first lesbian girl next door", and the Miami Herald to declare her South Florida's "most eligible lesbian". She was the runner-up in the first bisexual dating reality show A Shot at Love with Tila Tequila and the final female contestant.  Most recently, she appeared in the third season of Kourtney and Kim Take Miami on the episode "Lez-B-Honest", which aired January 27, 2013.

Campbell is a firefighter/paramedic in Fort Lauderdale, Florida. During the show, she revealed that she came out as a lesbian to her mother at 16 years old. She also said she does not identify as either a butch or femme lesbian but as a cross between the two, in her words, "futch".

Following the airing of the show, she was considered a "celesbian" and developed a following, including 11- to 18-year-old girls and lesbians of all ages. During the airing of the show, she emerged as a fan favorite. MTV reported that Campbell was the most popular celebrity on one of its websites (iamonmtv.com), with 28,000 fans.

Campbell stated she was going to start a clothing line, called Futch Apparel, to cater to women like her who preferred gender-neutral or men's clothing in sizes appropriate for women. However, she instead operated a (now defunct) website called "Pink Boy Blue Girl" that sold only T-shirts and tank tops.

Campbell is a Democrat, endorsing Hillary Clinton in the 2016 presidential election.

References

External links
Profile from GO Magazine
Dani Campbell MySpace page

Year of birth missing (living people)
Living people
People from Fort Lauderdale, Florida
Participants in American reality television series
American lesbians
21st-century American LGBT people